Nemacheilus longipinnis is a species of ray-finned fish in the genus Nemacheilus.

Footnotes 
 

L
Freshwater fish of Indonesia
Fish described in 1922